Vesmonis "Ves" Balodis (24 October 1933 – 29 October 2020) was an Australian discus thrower who competed in the 1956 Summer Olympics. He was born in Auce, Latvia.

References

1933 births
2020 deaths
Australian male discus throwers
Olympic athletes of Australia
Athletes (track and field) at the 1956 Summer Olympics